La Florida y Luisiana is a rural community ('Comuna Rural') in Cruz Alta Department, Tucumán Province, Argentina. It lies to the east of Alderetes, which is part of the Greater Tucumán metropolitan area. It is also home to the La Florida football team.

References
 Sitio federal IFAM (Spanish)

Populated places in Tucumán Province